The Csardas Princess (German: Die Czardasfürstin) is a 1927 German-Hungarian silent romance film directed by Hanns Schwarz and starring Liane Haid, Imre Ráday and Ferenc Vendrey. It is based on the 1915 operetta The Csardas Princess, the title referring to the popular Hungarian Csárdás dance.

It was shot at the Babelsberg Studios in Berlin.

Cast
 Liane Haid as Sylva Verescu  
 Imre Ráday as Luftikus  
 Ferenc Vendrey as Baron Franz von Kerekes 
 Kálmán Zátony 
 Oskar Marion as Prinz Edwin von Weylersheim  
 Oreste Bilancia 
 Gyula Zilahi as Lebemann  
 Ibi Boya as Stasi  
 Bolla Marischka

References

Bibliography
 Grange, William. Cultural Chronicle of the Weimar Republic. Scarecrow Press, 2008.

External links

1927 films
1920s romance films
Films of the Weimar Republic
German silent feature films
German romance films
Hungarian silent feature films
Hungarian romance films
Films directed by Hanns Schwarz
Films based on operettas
UFA GmbH films
German black-and-white films
Films shot at Babelsberg Studios
Hungarian black-and-white films
1920s German films